Darb-e Juqa (also Romanized as Darb-e Jūqā and Darb Jūqā; also known as Darb-i Jugha and Darijoogha) is a village in Hastijan Rural District, in the Central District of Delijan County, Markazi Province, Iran. At the 2006 census, its population was 139, in 43 families.

References 

Populated places in Delijan County